New Hampshire's 22nd State Senate district is one of 24 districts in the New Hampshire Senate. It has been represented by Republican Daryl Abbas since 2022.

Geography
District 22 spans the state's southern border with Massachusetts in Hillsborough and Rockingham Counties, including the towns of Atkinson, Pelham, Plaistow, and Salem.

The district overlaps with both New Hampshire's 1st congressional district and New Hampshire's 2nd congressional district.

Recent election results

2022

Elections prior to 2022 were held under different district lines.

Historical election results

2020

2018

2016

2014

2012

Federal and statewide results in District 22

References

22
Hillsborough County, New Hampshire
Rockingham County, New Hampshire